Peroxiredoxin-6 is a protein that in humans is encoded by the PRDX6 gene. It is a member of the peroxiredoxin family of antioxidant enzymes.

Function 
The protein encoded by this gene is a member of the thiol-specific antioxidant protein family. This protein is a bifunctional enzyme with two distinct active sites. It is involved in redox regulation of the cell; it can reduce H(2)O(2) and short chain organic, fatty acid, and phospholipid hydroperoxides. It may play a role in the regulation of phospholipid turnover as well as in protection against oxidative injury.

= Model organisms 
=
				
Model organisms have been used in the study of PRDX6 function. A conditional knockout mouse line, called Prdx6tm1a(EUCOMM)Wtsi was generated as part of the International Knockout Mouse Consortium program — a high-throughput mutagenesis project to generate and distribute animal models of disease to interested scientists — at the Wellcome Trust Sanger Institute.

Male and female animals underwent a standardized phenotypic screen to determine the effects of deletion. Twenty five tests were carried out on mutant mice but no significant abnormalities were observed.

References

Further reading 

 
 
 
 
 
 
 
 
 
 
 
 
 
 
 
 
 
 

Genes mutated in mice
EC 1.11.1
EC 3.1.1